"It's the Same Old Shillelagh" is an Irish novelty song written by Pat White. Its subject is a young Irish-American who inherits his father's shillelagh.  The composer himself recorded this song on May 25, 1927 for Victor Records (No. 20760), and the record was distributed through the Yorkville Phonograph Shop in New York City.  RCA Victor pressed the record, but it carried a custom "Yorkville" label.

It was recorded by various artists of Irish-American ancestry, such as Billy Murray (recorded with Harry's Tavern Band, Bluebird 10811, 1940) and most notably Bing Crosby (recorded December 6, 1945 and included in his album St. Patrick's Day),  typically with an affected Irish accent.

Dennis Day included the song on his album Shillelaghs & Shamrocks! (1961).

Glen Daly included the song on his album It's Glen Again - "Live" at the Ashfield, Glasgow (1970).

Lyrics
An early, public version:

The Bing Crosby version:

References

Billy Murray (singer) songs
Bing Crosby songs
Irish novelty songs
1940s songs